Impressions is an original novel based on the U.S. television series Angel. Tagline: "Evil always leaves an impact."

Plot summary
It seems a quiet day at Angel Investigations until a desperate man arrives, chased by a demon. The gang kills the monster, which decomposes as soon as it dies. The man seems to have fallen victim to a stolen identity scam; he's been approached by a false Angel and is now distrustful of the real thing, so does not want to give up the ancient stone he's found.

Angel's worried by the notion of an impersonator, but Cordy's just curious why he didn't impersonate more worthy celebrities. Meanwhile, Lorne reports some bad mojo from Caritas, and needs help. Something is getting under local demons' skins, and even bothering Angel, heightening the aggression of normally rather pacifistic demons.

As their research continues, Cordelia and Fred learn that the Angel-impersonator- a photography student called David who saw Angel in action during his early days in Los Angeles- is impersonating Angel for no reason other than the power trip he gets when defeating demons, and doesn't truly understand the reasons why Angel does what he does. The stone that David's client possesses is later revealed to be the burial stone of a race of demons whose nature causes them to disintegrate upon death caused them to start using the stones as a memorial, the stones 'recording' their feelings at the moment of death. The stone the client possesses contains the rage and hostility of an honoured warrior who recently died in battle; in their home dimension, the stone's 'emissions' would normally be controlled by various spells, but without those spells the emotions are spilling out and 'infecting' every demon in the area.

In the final confrontation, as Angel and his associates attempt to aid the stone's owners in acquiring the stone while holding off a mass of demons, Angel nearly surrenders to his rage, but David's act of sacrifice during the battle, giving his life to save Angel's, gets through Angel's rage and allows him to focus long enough to allow the stone to be destroyed, thus ending the wave of hostility.

Continuity
Supposed to be set in Angel season 3, shortly after "That Old Gang of Mine"; Gunn attempts to recruit a new gang to replace his old one, but their impetuous attitude often results in them using incorrect methods of attempting to kill certain demons.

Characters include: Angel, Cordelia, Wesley, Gunn, Fred, and Lorne.

Canonical issues

Angel books such as this one are not usually considered by fans as canonical. Some fans consider them stories from the imaginations of authors and artists, while other fans consider them as taking place in an alternative fictional reality. However unlike fan fiction, overviews summarising their story, written early in the writing process, were 'approved' by both Fox and Joss Whedon (or his office), and the books were therefore later published as officially Buffy/Angel merchandise.

External links

Reviews
Litefoot1969.bravepages.com - Review of this book by Litefoot
Teen-books.com - Reviews of this book

Angel (1999 TV series) novels
2003 fantasy novels